Sudhauwala is a small city in Dehradun district, Uttarakhand, India.

References 

Cities and towns in Dehradun district